A flow diverter is an endovascular prosthesis used to treat intracranial aneurysms.  It is placed in the aneurysm's parent artery, covering the neck, in order to divert blood flow and determine a progressive thrombosis of the sac. Flow diverting stents consist of structural Cobalt-chrome or Nitinol alloy wires and often a set of radiopaque wires woven together in a flexible braid.

Medical usage
Flow diverters are treatment for intracranial aneurysms alternative to endosaccular coil embolization (although the techniques can be combined, especially in large/giant aneurysms). It is mainly effective in wide neck unerupted saccular aneurysms, that are difficult to coil because of the tendency of the coils to fill the parent artery (referred to as prolapse).  Another situation is fusiform shape or circumferential aneurysms. 
Prior to flow diverters many intracranial aneurysms went untreated. Flow diverters can be placed in the parent vessel or within the aneurysm, which are called intrasaccular flow diverters

Risks and complications
The efficacy of flow diverters can be evaluated using a grading system developed by researchers at Oxford Neurovascular and Neuroradiology Research Unit (Kamran et al. 2011), commonly referred to as flow diverter grading system or Kamran grading system. After receiving a cerebral flow diverter, patients are placed on dual antiplatelet therapy for an extended period of time to reduce the likelihood of peri-procedural and post-procedural thromboembolic complications. 

The degree of aneurysm occlusion is graded on a five-point scale from 0 (no change in the endoaneurysmal flow) to 4 (complete obliteration of the aneurysm). The patency status of the parent artery is evaluated on a three-point scale, from no change in the parent artery diameter  to parent artery occlusion. This grading system is used in clinical practice. It has also been used and adapted by researchers to evaluate and report the effectiveness of flow diverters in general.

See also 
 Blood flow
 Interventional neuroradiology
 Intracranial aneurysm

References

Further reading
 
 

Implants (medicine)
Prosthetics
Vascular diseases